Thomas Cain (12 October 1874 – 1897) was an English footballer who played as goalkeeper for Stoke, Everton and Southampton St. Mary's in the 1890s.

Football career
Cain was born in Sunderland and started his career with Hebburn Argyle before joining Stoke in 1893, where he took over in goal from the injured Bill Rowley for eleven league matches during the 1893–94 season.

In April 1894, he moved to Everton, making his first team debut as a replacement for the out of form Richard Williams in a 3–1 victory over Bolton Wanderers on 6 October 1894. Cain retained his place for a further nine league matches, before Williams was recalled. After two further appearances in March, Cain moved to the south coast to join Southampton St. Mary's for their second season in the Southern League.

In his Southampton debut, Cain replaced Walter Cox, but underwent a goalkeeper's nightmare, conceding seven goals away to Clapton on 19 October 1895. Despite this setback, he retained his place, although he missed several key games through injury, being replaced by the on-loan "Gunner" Reilly or by Cox.

Following the arrival of George Clawley, Cain moved on again at the end of the season, returning to the Football League with Grimsby Town for a then Southampton club record transfer fee of £20. Despite this fee, Cain only made two League appearances for Grimsby before returning to Hebburn Argyle in October.

Career statistics

References

External links
Everton profile

1874 births
Footballers from Sunderland
1897 deaths
English footballers
Association football goalkeepers
Hebburn Argyle F.C. players
Stoke City F.C. players
Everton F.C. players
Southampton F.C. players
West Stanley F.C. players
English Football League players
Southern Football League players
Grimsby Town F.C. players